This is a list of the mammal species recorded in Tajikistan. There are fifty-one mammal species in Tajikistan, of which four are endangered, six are vulnerable, and three are near threatened.

The following tags are used to highlight each species' conservation status as assessed by the International Union for Conservation of Nature:

Order: Rodentia (rodents) 

Rodents make up the largest order of mammals, with over 40% of mammalian species. They have two incisors in the upper and lower jaw which grow continually and must be kept short by gnawing.

Suborder: Sciurognathi
Family: Sciuridae (squirrels)
Subfamily: Xerinae
Tribe: Xerini
Genus: Spermophilopsis
 Long-clawed ground squirrel, S. leptodactylus LC
Tribe: Marmotini
Genus: Marmota
 Long-tailed marmot, Marmota caudata LC
 Menzbier's marmot, Marmota menzbieri VU
Family: Gliridae (dormice)
Subfamily: Leithiinae
Genus: Dryomys
 Forest dormouse, Dryomys nitedula LC
Family: Dipodidae (jerboas)
Subfamily: Allactaginae
Genus: Allactaga
 Severtzov's jerboa, Allactaga severtzovi LC
 Vinogradov's jerboa, Allactaga vinogradovi LC
Family: Cricetidae
Subfamily: Arvicolinae
Genus: Blanfordimys
 Afghan vole, Blanfordimys afghanus LC
 Bucharian vole, Blanfordimys bucharicus LC
Genus: Microtus
 Juniper vole, Microtus juldaschi LC
 Tien Shan vole, Microtus kirgisorum LC
Family: Muridae (mice, rats, voles, gerbils, hamsters, etc.)
Subfamily: Gerbillinae
Genus: Meriones
 Midday jird, Meriones meridianus LC
Subfamily: Murinae
Genus: Nesokia
 Short-tailed bandicoot rat, Nesokia indica LC

Order: Lagomorpha (lagomorphs) 

The lagomorphs comprise two families, Leporidae (hares and rabbits), and Ochotonidae (pikas). Though they can resemble rodents, and were classified as a superfamily in that order until the early 20th century, they have since been considered a separate order. They differ from rodents in a number of physical characteristics, such as having four incisors in the upper jaw rather than two.

Family: Leporidae (rabbits, hares)
Genus: Lepus
Desert hare, L. tibetanus  
Family: Ochotonidae (pikas)
Genus: Ochotona
 Large-eared pika, O. macrotis 
 Turkestan red pika, O. rutila

Order: Erinaceomorpha (hedgehogs and gymnures) 

The order Erinaceomorpha contains a single family, Erinaceidae, which comprise the hedgehogs and gymnures. The hedgehogs are easily recognised by their spines while gymnures look more like large rats.

Family: Erinaceidae (hedgehogs)
Subfamily: Erinaceinae
Genus: Hemiechinus
 Long-eared hedgehog, H. auritus 
Genus: Paraechinus
 Brandt's hedgehog, P. hypomelas

Order: Soricomorpha (shrews, moles, and solenodons) 

The "shrew-forms" are insectivorous mammals. The shrews and solenodons closely resemble mice while the moles are stout-bodied burrowers.

Family: Soricidae (shrews)
Subfamily: Crocidurinae
Genus: Crocidura
 Lesser rock shrew, C. serezkyensis 
Subfamily: Soricinae
Tribe: Soricini
Genus: Sorex
 Buchara shrew, S. buchariensis 
 Eurasian pygmy shrew, S. minutus

Order: Chiroptera (bats) 

The bats' most distinguishing feature is that their forelimbs are developed as wings, making them the only mammals capable of flight. Bat species account for about 20% of all mammals.

Family: Vespertilionidae
Subfamily: Myotinae
Genus: Myotis
Geoffroy's bat, M. emarginatus 
 Fraternal myotis, Myotis frater LC
Subfamily: Vespertilioninae
Genus: Eptesicus
 Botta's serotine, Eptesicus bottae LC
Genus: Otonycteris
 Desert long-eared bat, Otonycteris hemprichii LC
Subfamily: Miniopterinae
Genus: Miniopterus
Common bent-wing bat, M. schreibersii 
Family: Molossidae
Genus: Tadarida
 European free-tailed bat, Tadarida teniotis LC
Family: Rhinolophidae
Subfamily: Rhinolophinae
Genus: Rhinolophus
Greater horseshoe bat, R. ferrumequinum 
Lesser horseshoe bat, R. hipposideros

Order: Carnivora (carnivorans) 

There are over 260 species of carnivorans, the majority of which feed primarily on meat. They have a characteristic skull shape and dentition. 
Suborder: Feliformia
Family: Felidae (cats)
Subfamily: Felinae
Genus: Caracal
 Caracal, C. caracal 
Genus: Felis
Jungle cat, F. chaus 
African wildcat, F. lybica 
Asiatic wildcat, F. l. ornata
Genus: Lynx
 Eurasian lynx, L. lynx 
Genus: Otocolobus
Pallas's cat, O. manul 
Subfamily: Pantherinae
Genus: Panthera
 Snow leopard, P. uncia 
Family: Hyaenidae (hyaenas)
Genus: Hyaena
 Striped hyena, H. hyaena 
Suborder: Caniformia
Family: Canidae (dogs, foxes)
Genus: Canis
 Golden jackal, C. aureus 
 Gray wolf, C. lupus 
 Steppe wolf, C. l. campestris
Genus: Vulpes
 Red fox, V. vulpes 
Family: Ursidae (bears)
Genus: Ursus
 Brown bear, U. arctos 
Family: Mustelidae (mustelids)
Genus: Lutra
 European otter, L. lutra 
Genus: Meles
Caucasian badger, M. canescens  presence uncertain
Genus: Mustela
Mountain weasel, M. altaica 
 Stoat, M. erminea 
Steppe polecat, M. eversmannii 
Least weasel, M. nivalis

Order: Artiodactyla (even-toed ungulates) 

The even-toed ungulates are ungulates whose weight is borne about equally by the third and fourth toes, rather than mostly or entirely by the third as in perissodactyls. There are about 220 artiodactyl species, including many that are of great economic importance to humans.
Family: Bovidae (cattle, antelope, sheep, goats)
Subfamily: Antilopinae
Genus: Gazella
Goitered gazelle, G. subgutturosa 
Subfamily: Caprinae
Genus: Capra
Markhor, C. falconeri 
Siberian ibex, C. sibirica 
Genus: Ovis
Argali, O. ammon 
Urial, O. vignei 
Genus: Pseudois
Bharal, P. nayaur  presence uncertain, vagrant
Family: Cervidae (deer)
Subfamily: Cervinae
Genus: Cervus
Central Asian red deer C. hanglu

Locally extinct 
The following species are locally extinct:
 Cheetah, Acinonyx jubatus
 Dhole, Cuon alpinus
 Onager, Equus hemionus
 Leopard, Panthera pardus possibly locally extinct
 Tiger, Panthera tigris

See also
List of chordate orders
Lists of mammals by region
List of prehistoric mammals
Mammal classification
List of mammals described in the 2000s

References

External links

 01
Mammals
Tajik
Tajikistan